In the Shadow of the Glen, also known as The Shadow of the Glen, is a one-act play written by the Irish playwright J. M. Synge and first performed at the Molesworth Hall, Dublin, on October 8, 1903.  It was the first of Synge's plays to be performed on stage. It is set in an isolated cottage in County Wicklow in what was then the present day (c.  1903).

Important Characters
Daniel Burke, an elderly farmer
Nora Burke, his young wife
Michael Dara, a youthful shepherd
A Tramp, a tramp

Plot synopsis

A tramp seeking shelter in the Burkes' isolated farmhouse finds Nora tending to the corpse of Dan. Nora goes out to find Michael, and Dan reveals to the tramp that his death is a mere ruse. He plays dead again when Nora and Michael return, but leaps up in protest when Michael proposes to Nora. Dan kicks Nora out to wander the roads and she leaves with the tramp, who promises her a life of freedom.

Quotes
"... isn't a dead man itself more company than to be sitting alone, and hearing the winds crying, and you not knowing on what thing your mind would stay?" — Nora

"Maybe cold would be no sign of death with the like of him, for he was always cold, every day since I knew him — and every night, stranger" — Nora

"For what good is a bit of a farm with cows on it, and sheep on the back hills, when you do be sitting looking out from a door the like of that door, and seeing nothing but the mists rolling down the bog, and the mists again, and they rolling up the bog, and hearing nothing but the wind crying out in the bits of broken trees were left from the great storm, and the streams roaring with the rain." — Nora

References
Synge, J. M. The Complete Plays. 1st. New York: Vintage Books, 1935.
In the Shadow of the Glen in The Literary Encyclopedia
 Stevens, Bernard. Opera 'The Shadow of the Glen'

External links
 

1903 plays
Plays by John Millington Synge
Plays adapted into operas
One-act plays